Michel Dechmann (4 November 1896 – 12 September 1957) was a Luxembourgian wrestler. He competed in the Greco-Roman middleweight event at the 1920 Summer Olympics.

References

External links
 

1896 births
1957 deaths
Olympic wrestlers of Luxembourg
Wrestlers at the 1920 Summer Olympics
Luxembourgian male sport wrestlers
Sportspeople from Luxembourg City